Stigmaulax sulcatus is a species of predatory sea snail, a marine gastropod mollusk in the family Naticidae, the moon snails.

Distribution
An uncommon species -Western Atlantic sources

Description 
The maximum recorded shell length is 38 mm.

Habitat 
Minimum recorded depth is 0 m. Maximum recorded depth is 44 m.
Dredged at 150+ metres depth, off Barbados.

References

External links

Naticidae
Gastropods described in 1778